The Golden West League is a high school athletic league that is part of the CIF Southern Section. Member schools are public schools in Orange County. The league began play in 1994. Servite, Saddleback, and Tustin High School were founding members, but later left.

Member schools
 Garden Grove High School
 Godinez Fundamental High School
 Katella High School
 Ocean View High School
 Segerstrom High School 
 Westminster High School

References

CIF Southern Section leagues
Sports in Orange County, California